The 2022 Colorado State Rams football team represents Colorado State University in the 2022 NCAA Division I FBS football season. The Rams are led by first-year head coach Jay Norvell and play their home games at Sonny Lubick Field at Canvas Stadium in Fort Collins, Colorado, as members of the Mountain Division of the Mountain West Conference.

Previous season

In Steve Addazio's second and final year as head coach, the Rams finished the 2021 season with a 3–9 record, going 2–6 in Mountain West Conference play and finishing fifth in the Mountain division standings, above only New Mexico. Colorado State lost six consecutive games to end the season after beginning conference play 2–0.

The Rams recorded wins over Toledo, San Jose State, and New Mexico. The Rams lost games against South Dakota State, Vanderbilt, and Iowa, as well as going on a six-game Mountain West losing streak against Utah State, Boise State, Wyoming, Air Force, Hawaii, and Nevada.

Addazio was fired upon the conclusion of the season after he posted a record of 4–12 through his two years tenure. Four days later, on December 6, 2021, Nevada head coach Jay Norvell was hired as Colorado State's next head coach. Nevada offensive coordinator Matt Mumme and multiple other coaches followed Norvell to Fort Collins and joined the Colorado State coaching staff.

Upon the conclusion of the season, star tight end Trey McBride was named as the Nation's best tight end and received the Mackey Award. He was also awarded unanimous All-American status, becoming the fifth consensus All-American and first unanimous All-American in school history.

Preseason

Incoming transfers
As of February 16, 2022, Colorado State has added 21 transfers prior to the 2022 season, per the Coloradoan and 247Sports. Eleven of those transfers signed as part of the 2022 early signing class, which consisted of 22 athletes — 11 transfers and 11 high school recruits.

Recruiting class of 2022
Colorado State football signed 11 recruits as part of their 2022 early signing class, per 247Sports.com.

Star ratings vary by recruiting service; star ratings below are 247Sports Composite ratings, a composite average of ratings across major recruiting services provided by 247Sports.com.

*= 247Sports Composite rating; ratings are out of 1.00. (five stars= 1.00–.98, four stars= .97–.90, three stars= .80–.89, two stars= .79–.70, no stars= <70)
†= National Signing Days for 2022 class: Early: December 15, 2021. Regular: February 2, 2022..
‡= Despite being rated as a four star recruit by ESPN and 247Sports.com, Fox received a three star 247Sports Composite rating.

The 2022 early recruiting class included three teammates at Inglewood High School — Louis Brown, Justus Ross-Simmons, and Marshon Oxley. The class was highlighted by multiple players who flipped commitments from Nevada to Colorado State to stay with head coach Jay Norvell, as well as the class's highest rated recruit, Mekhi Fox, who flipped from UCLA to Colorado State. The class consisted of six recruits from California, two from Colorado, and one from Texas, New York, and Louisiana.

According to the Coloradoan, four other players have committed to the team, but have not signed a National Letter of Intent. They may sign a NLI at a later date, join the team as a walk-on, or play elsewhere. Either way, these players were not considered part of the official signing class:
Logan Flinta, wide receiver Aledo High School (Aledo, TX)
Brannan Mannix, defensive back Colleyville Heritage High School (Colleyville, TX)
Brady Radz, long snapper Cherry Creek High School (Greenwood Village, CO)
Trey Balsbaugh, kicker/punter Bishop Gorman High School (Las Vegas, NV)

Staff

Coaching changes
Head coach: On December 2, 2021, Colorado State announced that they had fired head coach Steve Addazio after two seasons. Addazio posted a record of 4–12 in his two years as head coach of the Rams. Four days later, on December 6, 2021, Nevada's head coach Jay Norvell was hired as Colorado State's next head coach. Norvell became the program's 24th head coach and the first Black head coach in school history. Addazio was later hired by Texas A&M as an offensive line coach.
Offensive coordinator: Nevada's offensive coordinator Matt Mumme was hired as Colorado State's new offensive coordinator and associate head coach. He replaced former offensive coordinator Jon Budmayr after one season.
Defensive coordinator: Montana State's defensive coordinator Freddie Banks was hired as Colorado State's new defensive coordinator. He replaced former defensive coordinator Chuck Heater after two seasons. Banks had worked with Norvell previously, serving as Nevada's cornerbacks coach in 2020.
Special teams coordinator: UTSA special teams coordinator Tommy Perry was hired to fill the team's special teams coordinator position that was left vacant during Addazio's tenure.
Running backs coach: Jeremy Moses was hired as Colorado State's new running backs coach. He replaced former running backs coach Brian White.
Wide receivers coach: Nevada's wide receivers coach Timmy Chang was originally one of the many Nevada coaches planning to follow Norvell to Colorado State, but was later hired by Hawaii as their new head coach. Nevada's tight end coach Chad Savage took the job instead.
Tight ends coach: James Finley, the wide receivers coach and recruiting coordinator at California high school Mater Dei, was hired as Colorado State's new tight ends coach. He replaced former tight ends coach Cody Booth.
Offensive line coach: Nevada's offensive line coach Bill Best was hired as Colorado State's new offensive line coach. He replaced former offensive line coach Louie Addazio, who was hired by Nevada.
Defensive line coach: North Dakota State's defensive ends coach Buddha Williams was hired as Colorado State's new defensive line coach. He replaced former defensive line and assistant head coach Antoine Smith.
Cornerbacks coach: Marcus Patton was hired by CSU as their new cornerbacks coach. He was previously the defensive coordinator at Tarleton State.
Linebackers coach: Montana State's defensive line coach Adam Pilapil followed defensive coordinator Freddie Banks to Colorado State to become the team's new linebackers coach. He replaced former linebackers coach Sean Cronin.
Strength and conditioning coach: Nevada's head strength and conditioning coach Jordan Simmons was hired for the same job at Colorado State.

2022 coaching staff

Schedule

Game summaries

No. 8 Michigan

Middle Tennessee State

Washington State

No. 7 (FCS) Sacramento State

Nevada

Utah State

Hawaii

Boise State

San Jose State

Wyoming

Air Force

New Mexico

References

Colorado State
Colorado State Rams football seasons
Colorado State Rams football